The Imperial is a modernist style twin-tower residential skyscraper complex in the billionaires row of Mumbai, India. It was the tallest skyscraper in India from 2010 to 2019 when it was overtaken by Lodha The Park which again was overtaken by Palais Royale Mumbai. It has been home to several high-net-worth individuals.

Location
Designed by architect Hafeez Contractor, The Imperial is built in Tardeo, South Mumbai and is perhaps Contractor's most recognisable project to date. The project's use of the modern urban redevelopment model in which the building firm provides free land and rehabilitation to slum dwellers in exchange for rights for property development was the first implementation of this model on a large scale.

See also
List of tallest buildings in Mumbai
List of tallest buildings in India

References

Residential buildings completed in 2010
Twin towers
Postmodern architecture in India
Residential skyscrapers in Mumbai
2010 establishments in Maharashtra